A binding protein is any protein that acts as an agent to bind two or more molecules together.

Examples include:

DNA-binding protein
Single-strand binding protein
Telomere-binding protein
RNA-binding protein
Poly(A)-binding protein
Nuclear cap-binding protein complex
CREB-binding protein
Calcium-binding protein
Calcium-binding protein 1
S100 calcium-binding protein A1
TATA-binding protein
Actin-binding protein

Most actin binding proteins bind on the actin surface, despite having different functions and structures.  

Penicillin binding proteins
Retinol binding protein
Retinol binding protein 4
EP300
Binding immunoglobulin protein
Odorant binding protein
Lipopolysaccharide-binding protein
C4b-binding protein
Rap GTP-binding protein
Calmodulin-binding proteins
Iron-binding proteins
Thyroxine-binding proteins
Folate-binding protein
Sterol regulatory element-binding protein
GTP-binding protein
Retinaldehyde-binding protein 1
Ccaat-enhancer-binding proteins
Androgen-binding protein
Maltose-binding protein
Phosphatidylethanolamine binding protein 1
Syntaxin binding protein 3
Insulin-like growth factor-binding protein
Methyl-CpG-binding domain protein 2
Growth hormone-binding protein
Vitamin D-binding protein
Syntaxin binding protein 2
Oxysterol-binding protein
E3 binding protein
Iron-responsive element-binding protein
Polypyrimidine tract-binding protein
Fatty acid-binding protein
Myosin binding protein C, cardiac
CPE binding protein

See also
 4EGI-1, a binding inhibitor

References

Proteins by function